British actress Keira Knightley has received numerous awards and nominations for her film and theatrical performances. Her major nominations include two Academy Awards, two British Academy Film Awards, three Golden Globe Awards, one Screen Actors Guild Award and one Laurence Olivier Award. 

Keira Knightley made her breakthrough with the 2002 sports film Bend It Like Beckham, for which she won the London Film Critics' Circle Award for Best Newcomer. For starring as Elizabeth Bennet in Pride & Prejudice (2005), 20-year-old Keira Knightley received her first nominations for a Golden Globe Award for Best Actress — Motion Picture Comedy or Musical and the Academy Award for Best Actress in a Leading Role, becoming the third-youngest Best Actress nominee at the time for the latter. She starred alongside James McAvoy in Atonement (2007) and gained her first nomination for a BAFTA Award for Best Actress in a Leading Role and second nomination for a Golden Globe Award for Best Actress in a Motion Picture — Drama. In 2009, Knightley appeared in Martin Crimp's West End production of The Misanthrope, which earned her a nomination for a Laurence Olivier Award for Best Actress in a Supporting Role in a Play in 2010. She portrayed Joan Clarke in The Imitation Game (2014) and received her second Academy Award and BAFTA Award nominations, and third Golden Globe Award nomination for Best Actress in a Supporting Role.

Major associations

Academy Awards

British Academy Film Awards

Golden Globe Awards

Screen Actors Guild Award

Industry awards

British Independent Film Awards

Theatre awards

Laurence Olivier Awards

Evening Standard Theatre Awards

Critics awards

Critics' Choice Movie Awards

London Film Critics' Circle Awards

Miscellaneous awards

Notes

See also
 List of British actors
List of British Academy Award nominees and winners
List of oldest and youngest Academy Award winners and nominees – Youngest nominees for Best Actress in a Leading Role
 List of actors with Academy Award nominations
 List of actors with two or more Academy Award nominations in acting categories
List of Keira Knightley performances

Knightley, Keira